Ciobanu is a commune in Constanța County, Northern Dobruja, Romania.

The commune includes two villages:
 Ciobanu
 Miorița (historical names: Cadi-Câșla, Bălăceanu until 1964)

Demographics
At the 2011 census, Ciobanu had 3,119 Romanians (99.84%), 5 others (0.16%).

References

Communes in Constanța County
Localities in Northern Dobruja